Noam Pitlik (November 4, 1932February 18, 1999) was an American television director and actor. In 1979, Pitlik won an Emmy for Outstanding Directing for a Comedy Series for his work on the ABC sitcom Barney Miller.

Early life
The son of Dr. and Mrs. Samuel Pitlik, he was born in Philadelphia. He was a graduate of Central High School, Gratz College, and Temple University.

Career
Pitlik began his acting career in a Western series on WCAU in Philadelphia. In 1951, he was part of the set design and construction crew for the Philadelphia Experimental Theater. In 1952, he was a member of the cast for the Summer Theater Guild's production of Philadelphia Story in Indiana, Pennsylvania.

In 1957, he starred in an Off-Broadway production of Kurt Weill's The Threepenny Opera.  During the 1960s and 1970s, Pitlik became a familiar character actor on television, making guest appearances in around 80 different TV series (making multiple appearances in several) including The Untouchables, The Rifleman, The Patty Duke Show, Gunsmoke, My Favorite Martian, Combat!, The Virginian, The Munsters, Gidget, The Andy Griffith Show, Gomer Pyle, U.S.M.C., The Invaders, The Fugitive, The F.B.I.,  Get Smart, I Dream Of Jeannie, Hogan's Heroes (in seven different roles, including in the pilot episode), The Monkees, Bewitched, The Flying Nun,  That Girl, Run for Your Life, The Mod Squad,  The Odd Couple, Nanny and the Professor, The Partridge Family, Room 222, Night Gallery, Love, American Style,  All in the Family, Mannix, Ironside, Cannon, Barnaby Jones, Hawkins, and The Six Million Dollar Man.  He had recurring roles on Ben Casey; I'm Dickens, He's Fenster;  The Bob Newhart Show  and Sanford and Son. He also appeared in TV movies, commercials and some theatrical films such as The Fortune Cookie, The Graduate, Fitzwilly  and The Front Page. Though he largely retired from acting in the mid-1970s to concentrate on directing, Pitlik still made a handful of widely spaced acting appearances over the next two decades. His final appearance as an actor was in an episode of Becker in 1998.

Pitlik directed episodes of 29 different TV series including Barney Miller (102 episodes, more than anyone else), Wings (27 episodes), Night Court (1 episode), Mr. Belvedere (44 episodes), Off the Rack (6 episodes), Taxi (11 episodes) and One Day at a Time (18 episodes).  In addition to the Emmy, he also received the Peabody Award and Directors Guild of America Award for his work on Barney Miller.

Personal life and death
Pitlik was married three times; his first marriage was to Jesse Blostein on February 11, 1967. They divorced on September 29, 1970. Pitlik next married Linda Hirsch on June 23, 1974; they divorced on April 25, 1977. Pitlik's last marriage was to Susan Whittaker on January 18, 1986. They remained married until his death at Cedars-Sinai Medical Center from lung cancer on February 18, 1999, at age 66.

Filmography

References

External links

 
 

1932 births
1999 deaths
American male film actors
American male television actors
American television directors
Television producers from Pennsylvania
Deaths from lung cancer in California
Jewish American male actors
Male actors from Philadelphia
20th-century American male actors
Directors Guild of America Award winners
Primetime Emmy Award winners
20th-century American businesspeople
20th-century American Jews